Sanandaj synagogue is located in Sanandaj, Iran. It is registered as #26979 in the Iran national index. The synagogue was constructed in the early Qajar period.

References

Synagogues in Iran
Orthodox synagogues
Orthodox Judaism in the Middle East
Buildings and structures in Kurdistan Province